New Monrovia was an African American community established near West Palm Beach, Florida in the area now known as Port Salerno.

There is a New Monrovia Park in Port Salerno, Florida. New Monrovia's one-room schoolhouse has been preserved. Costella Williams was the school's teacher for many years until it closed in the 1960s. It was submitted for a National Register of Historic Places listing in 2021. There is also a New Monrovia cemetery in Port Salerno. Teresa Clark owned the community's first store.

See also
Monrovia

References

Former municipalities in Florida